Homebridge Financial Services, Inc. (previously known as Real Estate Mortgage Network), is a privately held, non-bank loan company based in the United States. The company currently comprises approximately 3,000 associates and over 250 retail branches. The company also includes two separate wholesale loan operations, HomeBridge Wholesale (headquartered in Irvine, California), and REMN Wholesale (headquartered in Iselin, New Jersey). HomeBridge holds FNMA, GNMA, FHLMC, FHA and VA approvals, and maintains relationships with 49 investors of other non-agency products.

History
In 2012, Peter Norden became CEO of Real Estate Mortgage Network (REMN). On February 1, 2014, REMN changed its name to HomeBridge Financial Services. The company had four divisions: Homebridge Retail (its B2C retail lending division), Homebridge Wholesale (a B2B wholesale lending division), REMN Wholesale (a B2B wholesale lending division) and HomeBridge Funding (its B2B correspondent lending division). In mid-2015 HomeBridge Funding was acquired by Planet Home Lending, LLC.

In 2014 Homebridge funded $6.36 billion in home mortgage loans, and nearly $12 billion in its servicing portfolio. The company increased its funded home loans 36% in 2015 to $8.7 billion. Also in 2014, the company was ranked number ten on Mortgage Executive magazine's list of the "Top 100 Mortgage Companies in America". HomeBridge announced its acquisition of the operating assets of Prospect Mortgage on November 1, 2016. The company's current CEO is Peter Norden (a residential mortgage business entrepreneur).
 The company's president is Joel Katz.

In August 2021, Homebridge agreed to merge with fin-tech startup Figure Technologies, which provides financial services using blockchain technology.

References

External links
HomeBridge Wholesale
REMN Wholesale

Mortgage lenders of the United States
Companies based in Middlesex County, New Jersey
1989 establishments in New Jersey
Woodbridge Township, New Jersey
Financial services companies established in 1989